Threesome is a Canadian sex comedy film, directed by Nicolas Monette and released in 2017. The film stars Mélissa Désormeaux-Poulin as Estelle, a woman seeking to spice up her stale sex life with her husband Simon by organizing a threesome.

The film received two Prix Iris nominations at the 20th Quebec Cinema Awards, for Best Actress (Désormeaux-Poulin) and the Public Prize.

References

External links
 

2017 films
2010s sex comedy films
Canadian sex comedy films
Quebec films
2010s French-language films
Films about threesomes
French-language Canadian films
2010s Canadian films